Secret societies at the College of William & Mary in Williamsburg, Virginia, date back to the founding of the nation's first known collegiate secret society, The F. H. C. Society (founded on November 11, 1750). Today a number of secret societies are known (or believed) to exist at the College: the F.H.C Society or Flat Hat Club, P.D.A., the Seven Society, the 13 Club, the Ladies of Alpha, the Bishop James Madison Society, the Phi Society, the Wren Society, the Sage Society, the W Society, the Y's, The Penny Brigade, The Cord, The Order of the Silver Roses, Dirty Shirley Fraternity, Eagle J, The Fourth Wall, and one group "simply called the Society."

7 Society

The 7 Society is a senior class society believed to have been founded in 1826. Its seven members, selected in their junior year, work to honor and encourage those who help strengthen the university, often through gifts.  In 2003, for example, the "Sevens" left dozens of umbrellas for the Admissions Office to use during rainy campus tours. Historically, the society formally announced its members' identities as they graduated. In recent years, however, membership has become steeped in mystery—being only revealed in the event of death.

There are a number of other secret societies with the word "seven" in their name, though there is no known evidence connecting the groups. One such society is the Seven Society at University of Virginia, founded in 1905, also noted for its philanthropic practices.

13 Club

Given the society's name, the 13 Club, founded in 1890 and reactivated in 1994, is presumed to have thirteen members. Little information has been made public regarding their campus activities. In fact, the society maintains such a high level of secrecy that even members' wives and children are unaware of their membership. Such was the case of Louise Kale, Director of William and Mary's Historic Campus, who only became aware of her father's membership after his death. Although club membership and activities are kept secret, the 13s have allowed for outside communication through their campaign "Be Here Now" and campus speaker series "One Last Thing." In historical archives, a photo of their members was published in the 1939 edition of the W&M yearbook and presumably other years.

Alpha Society
The all-female Alpha Society was likely created to counteract the college's male-dominated secret societies. It was created by Martha Barksdale in 1918, a member of the first class of female students at William & Mary.  Their stated mission is that they are dedicated to empowering women and recognizing strong female leadership. They recognize female students and faculty monthly for their dedication to the college community by leaving yellow roses and notes for these individuals. Other details surrounding this society remain a mystery.

The Spectral Society 
The Spectral Society is just as elusive as its name. No one knows the date of its foundation, or number of members. To this day, no members have been revealed. It was believed that the society was founded for the students who went above and beyond, or sometimes below, to investigate and explore the mysteries of William and Mary. As far as anyone knows, it still continues today; evidence of which can be found in its distinctive symbol placed all over campus.

Bishop James Madison Society

The Bishop James Madison Society reports its founding year as 1812. Named in honor of William & Mary's eighth president, the late Bishop James Madison. The original society was forced to disband at the advent of the Civil War but it was reformed sometime in the 20th century. The society's activities, which seek to further the reputation, pride, and mirth of the college community, include the promotion of a "Last Lecture" in which it invites a noted faculty member to speak on issues of current social and/or academic importance. Membership in the society is confidential. During the college's annual commencement exercises, some graduating members identify their involvement by wearing medals featuring the society's symbol, an elongated quatrefoil.

The Cord
The Cord is believed to have been founded in 1881 after the College was forced to close as a result of financial issues dating back to the Civil War, and would not reopen until 1888.  President Ewell continued to ring the College Bell at the beginning of each academic year for the duration of the College's closure. The name "The Cord" is thought to have been taken from the cord that rings the College Bell as a symbol of the society's endurance through William and Mary's darkest years.  The society is said to consist of 8 members, 4 seniors who then select 4 juniors during each academic year to replace them and choose the next year's juniors.  Little is known about the actions of The Cord, but they appear to take part in several ceremonies and rituals around campus each year, set up by the seniors but attended only by its juniors.  Notable rumored members include Chris Genoa, Bill Mims, and Thao Nguyen.

Flat Hat Club

Founded during the early-20th century (and later revived in 1972), today's all-male Flat Hat Club is named in honor of the historic F. H. C. Society. The original F. H. C. Society was founded in 1750 under a secret Latin name, possibly Fraternitas, Humanitas, et Cognitio, Fraternitas Humanitas Cognitioque, or variations thereof. The club was informally referred to as the Flat Hat Club. Its members included St. George Tucker, Thomas Jefferson and George Wythe. In 1972, the society was reformed. According to The Flat Hat (a largely unaffiliated student newspaper), "new members are selected by those currently in the group. Historically, the group has tapped student government leaders, as well as several members of The Flat Hat [newspaper], which took its name from the historic group."

Furentes Viginti
Nothing is known about this society. "Furentes Viginti" translates directly to "Raging Twenty" from Latin.

P.D.A.

P.D.A. was the second fraternity after FHC to be established at William and Mary. Created in 1773. P.D.A. as a secret Latin name, was composed of seven individuals.  It continued in operation until 1976.

Phi Society
The Phi Society was created at the University of Virginia, but a chapter has been established at William & Mary. Little is known about this society at the college. Another similarly named organization, the Phi Society of 1883 exists at The University of the South. Outside of the fact that both organizations were created by former members of Phi Delta Theta, the two societies are unrelated. Both societies branched off from the main organization due to conflicts of interest with the national organization.

The Sage Society 
The origin of The Sage Society is unknown.  The organization promotes values of leadership and wellness within the William & Mary community.

W Society
Little is known about the W Society. It honors one freshman every year for service to the Williamsburg community. The members are selected via secret invitation. The Society is service focused.

Wren Society

The Wren Society is said to have been founded in 1832 to commemorate the 200th anniversary of British architect Sir Christopher Wren's birth. Sir Christopher Wren is the presumed designer of the Wren Building, which is the nation's oldest academic building. Like the Bishop James Madison Society, the Wren Society, was forced to disband at the start of the Civil War and later restored by students. Taps are selected based upon academic achievement, service to the campus community, and exceptional leadership.  The society strives for the betterment of the college.

The Guilded Hallway
The Guilded Hallway is a secret society shrouded in mystery, with a long and storied history that stretches back centuries. Little is known about its origins or the identity of its members, but rumors abound of powerful and influential individuals who are said to control the world's most important institutions from behind the scenes.

According to legend, the Guilded Hallway was founded by a group of wealthy and influential merchants in medieval Europe who sought to use their power and influence to shape the course of history. They met in secret, away from the prying eyes of the public and their political rivals, in a grand hallway lined with gilded walls and adorned with priceless works of art.

Over time, the Guilded Hallway's expansion found its way to William and Mary where the order has continued to meet for the appreciation of art and for the protection of the art and natural beauty that lives within the William and Mary Campus.

See also
Collegiate secret societies in North America

References

College of William & Mary student life
Collegiate secret societies